RailAdventure is a train operator based in Munich, Germany. Founded in 2006, it operates a fleet of ex Deutsche Bundesbahn and Swiss Federal Railways locomotives.

In April 2021 the company bought existing UK TOC Hanson & Hall Rail Services, subsequently renamed RailAdventure UK Ltd. As well as taking over the existing fleet of a Class 31 and a Class 50, the company purchased eight Class 43 powercars from Angel Trains, six for dual-car operational use, and two for spare parts. It has been involved in the hauling of Class 777 and Class 802 rollingstock to the Eurotunnel Calais Terminal on their delivery runs.

References

External links

Companies based in Munich
Railway companies established in 2006
Railway companies of Germany
2006 establishments in Germany